Treat or Treats may refer to:

Arts, entertainment, and media

Music

Albums
 Treat (album), a 1990 album by Dutch punk band The Ex and Scottish ex-pat tour mates Dog Faced Herman
 Treats (album), the 2010 debut studio album of American noise pop duo Sleigh Bells

Groups and labels
 Treat (band), a Swedish band successful in the 1980s
 Treat Records, an American record label in 1955 only

Songs
"Treat", a song by Santana from the 1969 album Santana (1969 album)

Other uses in arts, entertainment, and media
 Treats (play), a 1975 play by Christopher Hampton
 treats!, a fine arts magazine that debuted in 2011
 "Treats!" (SpongeBob SquarePants), an episode of SpongeBob SquarePants

Places

United States
 Treat, Arkansas, an unincorporated community
 Treat, Georgia, a ghost town
 Treat River, Oregon

Elsewhere
 Treat, Algeria, a town

Other uses
 Transient Reactor Test Facility (TREAT), a nuclear reactor located at Idaho National Lab
 Treat (name), including a list of people with the name
 Treat Commercial Building, Leslie, Arkansas, United States, on the National Register of Historic Places
 Trees for the Evelyn and Atherton Tablelands

See also
 A-Treat Bottling Company
 Invitation to treat, inviting an offer
 TREAT-NMD, Translational Research in Europe – Assessment and Treatment of Neuromuscular Diseases
 Treating, serving refreshments for electoral gain
 Treatment (disambiguation)
 Snack, which can be known as a treat